The Argentina women's national tennis team represents Argentina in Billie Jean King Cup tennis competition and are governed by the Asociación Argentina de Tenis. The team's historical best results came in 1986 and 1993, when they reached the semifinals. Argentina played the last five years in the Americas Zone Group I, after being relegated losing World Group II Playoffs against Spain. Argentina are currently number 24 in the ITF rankings.

History
Argentina made its Fed Cup debut in 1964 with a win against Belgium. In the 1984 edition of the Fed Cup, Gabriela Sabatini, Argentina's highest ranked singles female player up to date, made its debut. Two years later, the team made it to the semifinals of the world group where they lost against locals Czechoslovakia. Argentina would not reach the semifinals again until 1993 thanks to the efforts of Florencia Labat, Patricia Tarabini and Inés Gorrochategui.

Current squad (2021)
 Nadia Podoroska
 María Lourdes Carlé
 Victoria Bosio 
 Guillermina Naya
 Jazmín Ortenzi

Recent performances
Here is the list of all match-ups since 1995, when the competition started being held in the current World Group format.

1990s

2000s

2010s

2020s

External links

Billie Jean King Cup teams
T